Cave City is an unincorporated community in Marion County, in the U.S. state of Missouri.

The community was named for nearby Mark Twain Cave.

References

Unincorporated communities in Marion County, Missouri
Unincorporated communities in Missouri